Rachel Baskerville (born 1951) is a New Zealand academic, and as of 2019 is a full professor at the Victoria University of Wellington.

Academic career

After a thesis titled  'Dimensions of CCA-1: an Oral History Study of the Failure of the Inflation Accounting Standard in New Zealand'  at the Victoria University of Wellington, Baskerville rose  to full professor.

Selected works 
 Baskerville, Rachel F. "Hofstede never studied culture." Accounting, organizations and society 28, no. 1 (2003): 1–14.
 Baskerville-Morley, Rachel F. "A research note: the unfinished business of culture." Accounting, Organizations and Society 30, no. 4 (2005): 389–391.
 Baskerville, Rachel, and Lisa Evans. The darkening glass: Issues for translation of IFRS. The Institute of Chartered Accountants of Scotland, 2011.
 Cordery, Carolyn J., and Rachel F. Baskerville. "Charity financial reporting regulation: a comparative study of the UK and New Zealand." Accounting History 12, no. 1 (2007): 7-27.

References

External links
  
 

1951 births
Living people
New Zealand women academics
Victoria University of Wellington alumni
Academic staff of the Victoria University of Wellington
New Zealand women writers